Frederick Brown (28 June 1895 – 6 November 1960) was an English professional footballer who played as an inside forward. His clubs included Sheffield United, Brighton & Hove Albion and Gillingham.

Career
The younger brother of former Sheffield United and England striker Arthur Brown Fred started his career with his hometown club of Gainsborough Trinity. During the war he would regularly guest for Sheffield United as he had taken up a job in a munitions factory in the city.  After a spell in the army he joined the Blades on a full-time basis after the end of World War I where he played for four seasons. Never a regular first choice he made only 44 appearances for the club before moving to Brighton & Hove Albion and Gillingham.

References

1895 births
1960 deaths
People from Gainsborough, Lincolnshire
English footballers
English Football League players
Association football forwards
Gainsborough Trinity F.C. players
Sheffield United F.C. players
Gillingham F.C. players
Brighton & Hove Albion F.C. players
British Army personnel of World War I